Triplophysa chondrostoma is a species of stone loach in the genus Triplophysa. It is endemic to the Qaidam Basin in Qinghai Province, China. It grows to  SL.

References

C
Freshwater fish of China
Endemic fauna of China
Taxa named by Solomon Herzenstein
Fish described in 1888